Harold William Gallop, later Harold Barry, (9 June 1910 – 13 July 2006) was a Canadian middle-distance runner. He competed in the men's 3000 metres steeplechase at the 1932 Summer Olympics.

References

External links
 

1910 births
2006 deaths
Athletes (track and field) at the 1932 Summer Olympics
Canadian male middle-distance runners
Canadian male steeplechase runners
Olympic track and field athletes of Canada
Athletes from Toronto